OpenOffice.org XML is an open XML-based file format developed as an open community effort by Sun Microsystems in 2000–2002. The open-source software application suite OpenOffice.org 1.x and StarOffice 6 and 7 used the format as their native and default file format for saving files. The OpenOffice.org XML format is no longer widely used, but it is still supported in recent versions of OpenOffice.org-descended software.

OpenDocument (ISO/IEC 26300:2006) is based on OpenOffice.org XML and these formats are very similar in many technical areas. However, OpenDocument is not the same as the older OpenOffice.org XML format and these formats are not directly compatible. In 2005, OpenOffice.org (since version 2.0) and StarOffice (since version 8) switched to OpenDocument as their native and default format.

History 

StarOffice developers adopted XML to replace the old binary StarOffice file format. The draft version was also known as StarOffice XML File Format.

The stated goal in the draft was:

File formats
The format uses XML files to describe the documents. To minimize space, the files are compressed into an archive and given a suffix depending on what sort of data is contained in them.

Implementations

 Abiword (SXW)
 Apache OpenOffice
 EditGrid Viewer (SXC)
 Gnumeric (SXC)
 Google Docs (SXW, import only)
 KOffice (SXW, SXC, SXI)
 LibreOffice (as of 4.3, import only)
 OpenOffice.org
 StarOffice/Oracle Open Office
 SoftMaker Office 2006
 TextMaker 2006 (SXW, import only)
 TextMaker Viewer (SXW, view only)
 Visioo-Writer (limited support)
 Zoho Office (SXW, SXC, SXI - view/edit/convert files)
Zoho Viewer (SXW, SXC, SXI - view/convert files)
Zoho QuickRead - a Firefox/Internet Explorer plug-in for online Viewer

See also
 List of document markup languages
 Comparison of document markup languages

References

External links
 OpenOffice.org XML File Format — File Format Specification and General Information
 Thinking XML: The open office file format - IBM technical library (January 1, 2003)

Document-centric XML-based standards
Office document file formats
Open formats
OpenOffice
XML markup languages